George Abbot School is a coeducational secondary school and sixth form with academy status in Burpham, north-east of the town centre of Guildford providing a comprehensive education, for around 2,000 young people, aged 11–18.

History 
The school is named after the Guildford-native 17th-century Archbishop of Canterbury George Abbot. The two main buildings are Elmslie and Raynham, named after the two headteachers when the buildings were separate schools, Miss Elmslie for girls, and Mr Raynham for boys.

Curriculum 
All students must take four GCSE subjects.
In Years 7 to 9, students are required to participate in five creative/expressive subjects: dance, drama, music, textiles and art. During Year 7 students are taught one language of either French, German, or Spanish. Upon going into Year 8, some are given the chance to take an additional language out of the original three. Some carry on these languages for GCSE. All GCSE students are advised to take at least one creative/expressive subject, which at GCSE include Photography, Computer Graphics and Architectural Design, however if they do pick four academic subjects or four creative subjects, that is accepted. Other subjects include History, Leisure and Tourism, Sociology and Physical Education.

Students take separate or combined science GCSEs (all involve Chemistry, Physics and Biology). Religious education is divided into roughly half of students who take a short-course and half a long-course GCSE. An option exists of taking fast track foreign languages (a year early) so pupils are able to learn another language (Spanish, German, or French) to take two language GCSEs. Fast track art is available to all students who excel in the arts.

Sixth Form 
George Abbot has a Sixth Form with nearly 500 students. It offers a choice of over 40 subjects at A level and BTEC, GCSE re-take options and enrichment courses. In addition to academic study, it offers a graduation programme that allows students to develop their wider knowledge and acquire transferable skills. Facilities include a Sixth Form Centre, artificial pitch and sports fields, a Fitness Suite and a common room.

House System 
Students are divided into the following 5 houses:Activities run throughout the year in all faculties and points culminate in the House Trophy.

Notable former pupils

Sport 
Alex McCarthy, Premier League goalkeeper
Ashley Giles MBE, cricketer
Georgina Hermitage, paralympic sprinter
Liam Heath, canoeist and Olympic gold medallist
Matt Jarvis, professional footballer
Rachel Cawthorn, Olympic canoeist

Music 

John Renbourn, folk guitarist and former member of Pentangle

Film/TV 

 Ellie Wallwork, actress

References

External links
Official website

Secondary schools in Surrey
Training schools in England
Academies in Surrey
Schools in Guildford